Timescape, released on video as Grand Tour: Disaster in Time, is a 1992 American science fiction film directed by David Twohy and starring Jeff Daniels and Ariana Richards, with a cameo appearance by Robert Colbert, one of the co-stars of Irwin Allen's 1960s TV series The Time Tunnel. Twohy wrote the screenplay, which is loosely based on the 1946 novella "Vintage Season" by Henry Kuttner and C.L. Moore (writing as Lawrence O'Donnell).

Plot
The grieving widower Ben Wilson is renovating an old guest house on the outskirts of his hometown with his young daughter, Hillary. The local bus driver, Oscar, arrives with a group of peculiarly behaved and dressed tourists, who insist on staying at the remote guest house, instead of the town center's large hotel. When Ben aids one of the tourists, Quish, after a minor accident, he discovers that Quish's passport is inexplicably stamped with locations, dated decades apart, that correspond to famous disasters, including the 1906 San Francisco earthquake, the crash of the Hindenburg, and the 1980 eruption of Mount St. Helens. Ben confronts Quish, who responds only by warning Ben to leave town. Meanwhile, Ben's vengeful father-in-law, Judge Caldwell, who blames Ben for his daughter's death, has Ben declared an unfit parent and takes custody of Hillary.

One of the tourists, Reeve, confirms Ben's suspicions about their true nature: they are time-travelers from the future who visit famous disasters from their past. She drugs and seduces Ben and leaves him unconscious.  Oscar finds and revives him. As they attempt to confront the tourists at the guest house, a meteorite strike devastates the town. Ben finds Hilary alive at Caldwell's house, and they spend the night and help survivors while the tourists stroll through the devastation in detached fascination. The next day, Ben realizes that the tourists are still in town;l. He deduces that they are awaiting a second disaster, which will soon affect a local school, which is being used as a relief center. As he rushes there, a gas explosion destroys the building and kills Hillary and most of the other erstwhile survivors, as well as Quish, who had followed Ben. The tourists take Ben prisoner so that an official from their time, the Undersecretary, can investigate and attempt to mend Ben's "timescape." After Ben accuses Reeve of lacking humanity, she slips him Quish's passport, which conceals a time travel device.

Ben travels to the previous evening. He tries to remove Hilary from Caldwell's house but is caught and arrested. Using his one phone call, he contacts his pre-existing self before Reeve can incapacitate him. Ben's earlier self helps him escape from the jail, and together, the two Bens draw most of town's residents to safety at a church on the other side of town by ringing the church bells to the tune of Für Elise, his wife's favorite piece of music. Leaving Hilary with his earlier self, Ben meets with the Undersecretary to return to his original timeframe. He warns Ben not to interfere any further and threatens to reset the timeline. Ben calls his bluff since the Undersecretary would have already done so if he had the ability.

Some time later, Hilary takes bookings for the completed guest house while Ben reads through old love letters from his late wife. When Hilary looks up, Ben has vanished, and Hilary hears someone playing Für Elise on the piano.

Cast

References

External links

1992 films
1990s science fiction adventure films
American science fiction adventure films
Films directed by David Twohy
Films about time travel
Films with screenplays by David Twohy
Films based on science fiction novels
1992 directorial debut films
1990s English-language films
1990s American films